Aschau may refer to:

in Germany:
Aschau am Inn, a municipality in the district of Mühldorf, Bavaria
Aschau im Chiemgau, a municipality in the district of Rosenheim, Bavaria
Aschau im Chiemgau station, a railway station
Aschau (Lachte), a river of Lower Saxony
in Austria:
Aschau im Zillertal, a municipality in Tyrol